"We're Free" is a song written by Irwin Levine and L. Russell Brown and performed by Beverly Bremers. It reached No. 15 on the Billboard easy listening chart and No. 40 on the Billboard Hot 100 in 1972.  The song was featured on her 1972 album, I'll Make You Music.

The song was produced by Irwin Levine, L. Russell Brown, and Mickey Eichner and arranged by Norman Bergen.

References

1972 songs
1972 singles
Beverly Bremers songs
Songs written by Irwin Levine
Songs written by L. Russell Brown
Scepter Records singles